Dan Sinh Market (Vietnamese: Chợ Dân Sinh), also known as American Market or Yersin Market, is a retail market in District 1, Ho Chi Minh City. Located on Yersin Street (named after French microbiologist Alexandre Yersin), the market is known for selling Vietnam War-era American memorabilia and military surplus.

References 

Retail markets in Ho Chi Minh City